Sir Gerald Hallen Creasy  (1 November 1897 – 9 June 1983) was a British colonial administrator. He served as Governor of the Gold Coast and Malta.

The "Christiansborg cross-roads shooting incident" that led to the 1948 Accra Riots occurred while Creasy was Governor in Gold Coast.

Gold Coast
Creasy was appointed governor on 12 January 1948. He succeeded Sir Alan Burns. He is however most remembered in Ghana for the "Christiansborg cross-roads shooting incident" on 28 February 1948, about six weeks into his job. Three unarmed former World War II veterans were killed and 60 wounded that day while demonstrating about end of service benefits. The protests had followed the Association of West African Merchants (AWAM) boycotts in Accra. This played into the hands of the local political leadership, the United Gold Coast Convention (UGCC).

Led by the Big Six, they sent a cable on the same day to the Secretary of State in London.
"...unless Colonial Government is changed and a new Government of the people and their Chiefs installed at the centre immediately, the conduct of masses now completely out of control with strikes threatened in Police quarters, and rank and file Police indifferent to orders of Officers, will continue and result in worse violent and irresponsible acts by uncontrolled people.

They also blamed "Crazy Creasy" for all the unrests. The Riot Act was read the next day, 1 March 1948 and the Big Six were arrested and detained. The Watson commission of enquiry chaired by Mr. Aiken Watson, was set up to look into the riots. He was replaced in an acting capacity by Sir Robert Scott as governor of the Gold Coast on 15 February 1949.

Malta
Creasy succeeded Sir Francis Campbell Ross Douglas as Governor of Malta on 16 September 1949. He was succeeded by Sir Robert Laycock on 3 August 1954.

See also
 The Big Six (Ghana)

References

External links
 Creasy in Malta
 Memorial of Adjetey, Attipoe and Lamptey

1897 births
1983 deaths
Knights Grand Cross of the Order of St Michael and St George
Officers of the Order of the British Empire
Governors and Governors-General of Malta
Colonial Administrative Service officers
Politics of Ghana
1948 in Gold Coast (British colony)